I Love You Too may refer to:

 I Love You Too (2001 film), a Dutch film by Ruud van Hemert
 I Love You Too (2010 film), an Australian film by Daina Reid
 "I Love You Too" (Entourage), an episode of Entourage
 I Love You Too, a 1989 album by Ted Hawkins
 "I Love You Too", a song by Aaradhna from I Love You
 "ILY2", a song by Charli XCX from Number 1 Angel

English phrases